Colonel Neelakantan Jayachandran Nair, AC, KC (popularly known as "NJ") was a highly decorated officer of the Indian Army. On 20 December 1993, while heading an advance party of the battalion, his convoy was ambushed by Naga rebels. Nair personally led the attack to break the ambush and sacrificed his life defending his men. For this act of valour, he was conferred the Ashoka Chakra.

Technically Nair is the most decorated officer of the Indian Army, as the only serviceman to have been awarded both the highest (Ashoka Chakra) and second highest (Kirti Chakra) awards for gallantry.

Early life and education
He was born to R. Neelakantan Nair and P.Saraswathy Amma on 17 Feb 1951 at Ernakulam, then in Travancore-Cochin, now Kerala. He was a descendant of the former Dewan Peshkar of Travancore, Kappazhom Raman Pillai. Nair was an alumnus of Sainik School, Kazhakootam, Kerala. He then joined the National Defence Academy, Pune as part of the 38th course. He was a member of the 'I' Squadron. He attended the Defence Services Staff College in Wellington.

Military career
Nair was commissioned into 16 Maratha Light Infantry on 13 June 1971. He was promoted lieutenant on 13 June 1973 and to captain on 13 June 1977. His career in the Indian Army spanned over two decades, during which he had held varied command as well as staff appointments.
He served in the IMTRAT in Bhutan. He also served as an instructor at the Army Intelligence school in Pune.

In 1983, in Mizoram, Nair engaged the insurgents in Close-quarters combat for which he was awarded the Kirti Chakra in recognition of his exceptional gallantry. He was promoted substantive major on 13 June 1984, and was promoted lieutenant-colonel (by selection) on 1 January 1992.

In 1993, his unit, the 16th battalion the Maratha Light Infantry was deployed in Nagaland. In December 1993, he was leading an advance party convoy in Nagaland, when they were ambushed by about one hundred insurgents. The overwhelming fire from automatic weapons killed one junior commissioned officer and 13 jawans on the spot. Col Nair, who was seriously injured, did not lose his courage. mindful of his serious injury, he organised his jawans in an assault line and charged at the insurgents when they broke ranks and fled. For his courage and gallantry he was awarded the Ashoka Chakra posthumously in 1994.

Major decorations
Ashoka Chakra
Kirti Chakra

See also
Kappazhom Raman Pillai

References

1951 births
Indian Army officers
Indian military personnel killed in action
1993 deaths
Recipients of the Ashoka Chakra (military decoration)
Malayali people
Military personnel from Thiruvananthapuram
Sainik School alumni
National Defence Academy (India) alumni
Ashoka Chakra
Recipients of the Kirti Chakra
Kirti Chakra